The 2013–14 Moldovan "A" Division season is the 23rd since its establishment. A total of 14 teams are contesting the league.

Teams

League table

Round by round

Results

Top goalscorers
Updated to matches played on 30 May 2014.

References

External links
Divizia A - Moldova - Results, fixtures, tables and news - Soccerway

Moldovan Liga 1 seasons
2013–14 in Moldovan football
Moldova